Samuel Augspurger Farm is a historic building near Trenton, Ohio, listed on the National Register of Historic Places in 1984.

The farmhouse, barn, family cemetery and 17 acres are now owned by Butler County Metroparks and operated as a museum known as the Chrisholm Historic Farmstead.

Historic uses 
Single Dwelling - 1874 farmhouse.
Cemetery
Agricultural Outbuildings, including the Rosemont Barn.

Notes

External links
Chrisholm Historic Farmstead - official site
Ohio Historic Inventory

Houses on the National Register of Historic Places in Ohio
Museums in Butler County, Ohio
National Register of Historic Places in Butler County, Ohio
Historic house museums in Ohio
Houses in Butler County, Ohio